Samthar is a city and a municipal board in Jhansi district in the Indian state of Uttar Pradesh. Historically before independence of India, it was also known as Samshergarh erstwhile capital of Samthar State

Demographics 
 census, Samthar had a population of 20,227. Males constitute 53% of the population and females 47%. Samthar has an average literacy rate of 55%, lower than the national average of 59.5%: male literacy is 66%, and female literacy is 43%. In Samthar, 16% of the population is under 6 years of age.

History 
Samthar was formerly known as Samshergarh and was capital of the princely state of Samthar State. 
The independent state of Samthar was created by king  Chandrabhan Gurjar and his grandson  Madan Singh Gurjar.

The founder was Ranjith Singh, who was a diwan of Datia. In 1817 Samthar was recognized as a state by the British.

They received a sanad of adoption in 1862. In 1884 the state had to cede some territories for the construction of the railways.

Mahraja Chattar Singh Bahadur, a Khatana Gurjar succeeded to the gaddi in 1865. His great-grandson, Raja Ranjit Singh declared himself as the Raja towards the end of the 18th century.

References 

Gurjar
Cities and towns in Jhansi district
Former capital cities in India